Bernard Ollivier (born 1938) is a French journalist and writer, known in particular for his travel stories, and founder of an association for the reintegration of young people through walking.

Life 
Born in Manche, Ollivier led a career as a political and economic journalist. After he retired, he decided both to devote himself to writing and to walk to Santiago de Compostela, then undertook a long 12,000 km walk from Istanbul to Xi'an along the silk road. As a writer, he publishes short stories including a collection on the homeless, detective novels, but also stories of his travels. The success of his works enabled him to later found the Seuil association for the reintegration of young people in difficulty through walking. In 2019, Ollivier founded the Air.e Association in collaboration with Bénédicte Flatet. Air.e's objectives include promoting awareness of the climate crisis and establishing self-sustaining villages. To this end, the association has organized two "Marches pour demain" (Walks for Tomorrow) in Brittany, France, the first in 2021 and the second scheduled for July 2022.

Publications 
 Longue marche : à pied de la Méditerranée jusqu'en Chine par la route de la soie, Phébus, 4 volumes, volume I, Traverser l'Anatolie (2000); volume II, Vers Samarcande (2001); volume III, Le vent des steppes (2003). (Prix Joseph-Kessel 2001). Volume IV, Longue marche, suite et fin (2016). English translations of the first three volumes are available from Skyhorse Publishing (New York): volume I, Out of Istanbul (2019); volume II, Walking to Samarkand (2020); volume III, Winds of the Steppe (2020), and a translation of volume IV is planned. 
 Nouvelles d’en bas, 2001, Fiction about the homeless in the métro. 
 L’allumette et la bombe, 2007, essay on the suburbs after the 2005 French riots and description of the methods of his association.
 Carnets d’une longue marche, 2005, watercolors by François Dermaut, and texts by Bernard Ollivier, about the Silk Road.
 Aventures en Loire, Phébus, 2009, on a 1000 km trip by foot and canoe along the river Loire.
 La vie commence à 60 ans, 2012.
 Histoire de Rosa qui tint le monde dans sa main, 2013.
 Sur le chemin des ducs : la Normandie à pied, de Rouen au Mont-Saint-Michel, 2013.
 Marche et invente ta vie : adolescents en difficulté, ils se reconstruisent par une marche au long cours, Arthaud, 2015.
 L'Essence de la Vie : Ils quittent la ville pour vivre de la terre, Arthaud, 2019.

Bibliography

References 

1938 births
Living people
French travel writers
20th-century French writers
21st-century French journalists
20th-century French journalists
Joseph Kessel Prize recipients
People from Manche